Arévalo may refer to:

Municipalities in Spain
Arévalo de la Sierra, municipality located in the province of Soria, Castile and León
Montejo de Arévalo, municipality located in the province of Segovia, Castile and León
Nava de Arévalo, municipality located in the province of Ávila, Castile and León
San Vicente de Arévalo, municipality located in the province of Ávila, Castile and León

Others
Arévalo (surname)
Arevalo, Iloilo City, Philippine district of Iloilo City
Museo de Historia de Arévalo, museum devoted to the history of the town of Arévalo in Spain
Paco Arévalo (1947), Spanish comedian